Rudbar County is in Gilan province, Iran. The capital of the county is the city of Rudbar. At the 2006 census, the county's population was 101,884 in 27,902 households. The following census in 2011 counted 100,943 people in 30,312 households. At the 2016 census, the county's population was 94,720 in 31,146 households. Rubar County was formed after a meeting between some Rudbari merchants and politicians, such as Ziaeddin Tavakkoli and Reza Shah.

Administrative divisions

The population history of Rudbar County's administrative divisions over three consecutive censuses is shown in the following table. The latest census shows four districts, 10 rural districts, and seven cities.

References

 

Counties of Gilan Province